"Unbreakable" is a song by Swiss recording artist Stefanie Heinzmann. Written by Joss Stone and Rick Nowels, it was produced by Marek Pompetzki and Paul NZA for her second studio album, Roots to Grow (2009). The song was released as the album's second single.

Charts

Weekly charts

References

External links
  
 
 Lyrics of this song - Unbreakable

2009 singles
2009 songs
Stefanie Heinzmann songs
Songs written by Joss Stone
Songs written by Rick Nowels